Martin Horn may refer to:

 Martin Horn (athlete) (born 1969), German paralympic athlete
 Martin Horn (politician) (born 1984), mayor of Freiburg im Breisgau